The  (literally Church of Maradona or Maradonian Church) is a parody religion, created by fans of the late Argentine footballer Diego Maradona, whom they believe to be the greatest of all time.

The Church was founded on October 30, 1998 (Maradona's 38th birthday) in the city of Rosario, Argentina by three fans (Héctor Campomar, Alejandro Verón and Hernán Amez). It could be seen as a type of syncretism or as a religion, depending on what religious definition one chooses to use. It was said by Alejandro Verón, one of the founders: "I have a rational religion and that's the Catholic Church and I have a religion passed on my heart and passion and that's Diego Maradona." Supporters of the Church, supposedly from all parts of the world, count the years since Maradona's birth in 1960 with the era designation .

They also use  for Maradona since it fuses  ("God") and 10, the number on Maradona's jersey. The church has expanded to other countries such as Spain, Italy, Germany, United Kingdom, Scotland, Japan, Afghanistan , Peru, Brazil, Chile, Mexico, Uruguay and United States, among many others.  In Spain, for example, it is believed that there are more than 9,000.

Ten Commandments
The "Ten Commandments" of the Iglesia Maradoniana are:
 The ball is never soiled. 
 Love football above all else. 
 Declare unconditional love for Diego and the beauty of football. 
 Defend the Argentine shirt. 
 Spread the news of Diego's miracles throughout the universe. 
 Honour the temples where he played and his sacred shirts. 
 Don't proclaim Diego as a member of any single team. 
 Preach and spread the principles of the Church of Maradona. 
 Make "Diego" your middle name
 Name your first son "Diego"

See also
 Parody religion

References

 
 BBC article by Tim Vickery.

External links
 Official website (archived)

Argentine satire
Association football supporters' associations
Football in Argentina
Religion in Argentina
Religious parodies and satires
Sports fandom
Subcultures of religious movements
Cultural depictions of Diego Maradona
1998 establishments in Argentina